St John the Baptist Church is located in Perth, Perth and Kinross, Scotland. Of Scottish Episcopalian denomination, it is located on Princes Street, at its junction with Canal Street, in the southeastern corner of the city centre. It adjoins the Greyfriars Burial Ground on its western side. Completed in 1851, it is now a Category B listed building. The church's architects were John Hay, William Hardie Hay and James Murdoch Hay, three brothers from Liverpool.

Andrew Granger Heiton, nephew of Andrew Heiton, made additions in 1914.

The site on which the church stands was purchased in 1795, on the condition that a place of worship for Church of England services be its only use. The chapel constructed that year was demolished in 1850 to make way for today's structure.

See also

List of listed buildings in Perth, Scotland

References

External links
 

Category B listed buildings in Perth and Kinross
Listed churches in Scotland
John's Scottish Episcopalian, Saint
1851 establishments in Scotland
Listed buildings in Perth, Scotland
Episcopal church buildings in Scotland